Stephanie Zavala (born May 29, 1996) is a right-handed American professional ten-pin bowler from Downey, California, known for winning the 2022 PWBA Tour Championship. She bowls professionally on the Professional Women's Bowling Association (PWBA) Tour, and has bowled internationally as a member of Team USA.

Zavala is a member of the 900 Global pro staff. She is also sponsored by BowlerX.com.

Amateur career
Zavala was a member of Junior Team USA in 2017, and is a two-time Team USA member (2017 and 2022). She finished runner-up to Julia Bond in the 2017 U.S. Amateur Championships. She bowled collegiately for Sam Houston State University from 2014 through 2018, and was an honorable mention All-American for the 2017–18 season.

At a July 7, 2019 session in her Mexican-American Bowlers Association league at Del Rio Lanes in Downey, California, Zavala rolled games of 279, 300 and 280 for a house-record 859 series. The series was the highest recorded by any female bowler in 2019 across the entire United States Bowling Congress.

Professional career
Zavala joined the PWBA Tour in the 2021 season. She had immediate success, making six championship round appearances (tied for first), winning three titles (also tied for first), and earning PWBA Rookie of the Year honors. She became the first PWBA Tour rookie to win three titles since Leanne (Barrette) Hulsenberg in 1987. Zavala’s best finish in a 2021 major tournament was fourth at the U.S. Women's Open.

After some early struggles in the 2022 season, Zavala won the season's final event, the PWBA Tour Championship, for her fourth PWBA title and first major. She won in dominating fashion, averaging 250.67 over her three stepladder matches.

PWBA Tour wins
Major championships are in bold text.
2021 PWBA Greater Cleveland Open
2021 PWBA BVL Open
2021 PWBA Reno Classic
2022 PWBA Tour Championship

Personal
Stephanie is a Southern California native and the daughter of Estela and Armando Zavala. In the offseason, she works for The Professional Approach, a pro shop with three bowling center locations in the Greater Los Angeles area.

References 

American ten-pin bowling players
1996 births
Living people